"I Love You Always Forever" is the debut single by Welsh singer Donna Lewis from her debut album, Now in a Minute (1996). Written by Lewis and produced by Lewis and Kevin Killen, it was released as the album's lead single in the United States on 7 May 1996 and in the United Kingdom on 26 August 1996. The song is inspired by H. E. Bates' novel Love for Lydia, from which the chorus is taken.

The song was a commercial hit, peaking at number five on the UK Singles Chart and reaching the top 10 in more than 15 countries, including Australia, Austria, Canada, France, Ireland, and Norway. In the US, the song rose to number two on the Billboard Hot 100, where it remained for nine weeks, behind Los del Río's "Macarena". The single additionally reached number one on the Billboard Mainstream Top 40 chart for eleven weeks and the Billboard Adult Top 40 chart for eight weeks. It was certified platinum in Australia and the UK and gold in France, Germany, New Zealand, Norway, and the US. The success of the song saw Lewis nominated for the Brit Award for Best British Female Artist in 1997.

In 2016, a cover version of the song by Australian pop singer Betty Who peaked at number six on the ARIA Singles Chart and topped the US Billboard Dance Club Songs chart.

Background
Inspired by the novel Love for Lydia by English author H. E. Bates, "I Love You Always Forever" is a pop song in which the singer declares her endless love for her significant other. The song was originally titled "Lydia", but was later changed because there was no mention of anyone with that name in the song. The chorus, "I love you always forever, near and far closer together", is a quote taken directly from the book.

Composition
"I Love You Always Forever" is written in the key of C major in common time with a tempo of 104 beats per minute. Lewis' vocals span from F3 to G4 in the song.

Reception
The success of "I Love You Always Forever" earned Lewis a nomination for Best British Female Artist at the 1997 Brit Awards. In the US, Andrea Ganis, executive VP of Lewis' record label, Atlantic, said: "Radio stations across the country keep telling us the same thing over and over", Ganis says. "They play it and, almost overnight, it's their most requested song. Maybe it's because things have been so dark lately in pop and then along comes a record that everybody can sing along to. It's almost like a catharsis for a lot of people." It became a "runaway hit" without any extra marketing boost from high-profile events of the time such as a hit movie or the 1996 Atlanta Olympic Games, and was the first single to achieve over one million airplay detections in the US.

AllMusic editor Tom Demalon called the song "compelling" in his review of Now in a Minute. He noted that Lewis "has a girlish voice that sounds like a less quirky Kate Bush." Billboard described it as a "quietly percussive pop chugger", complimenting Lewis' voice as a "delicate, girlish voice that gives the song a winsome quality, which adds to its already considerable charm." Tracey Pepper from Entertainment Weekly noted that it is "more sophisticated than a first listen might reveal. "I Love You Always Forever"'s chanted chorus, chugging rhythm, and bright melody make it obvious that the newcomer Donna Lewis, whose girlish voice often sounds like Cyndi Lauper's, knows the value of building tension and mood, even in a pop song." Kim Renfro of Insider said that the song is a "true bop" that is reminiscent of Cyndi Lauper's music of 10 years earlier, but with "slightly more pizazz". Eamon Joyce from Miscellany News commented that "upon hearing the song, it's embedded in your head for weeks." Bob Waliszewski of Plugged In stated that Lewis "pledges lifelong commitment" on the song. In 2018, Stacker ranked it at number 10 in their list of "Best pop songs of the last 25 years", noting Lewis' "ethereal voice over a heavenly backdrop of synthesizers and understated drum beats".

Music video
The song's accompanying music video was directed by Randee St. Nicholas. It is very simple, showing Lewis performing the song dressed in all white in a beige rotating room. Other scenes feature her against a black background, with snow boots on her hands against a wall, and playing a piano.

Track listings

UK CD single
 "I Love You Always Forever" (LP version) – 3:59
 "Pink Chairs" – 3:26
 "Have You Ever Loved" – 3:31
 "I Love You Always Forever" (Philly remix) – 4:00

UK cassette single
 "I Love You Always Forever" (LP version) – 3:59
 "I Love You Always Forever" (Philly remix) – 4:00

European CD single
 "I Love You Always Forever" (radio edit) – 3:21
 "I Love You Always Forever" (Philly mix) – 4:00
 "I Love You Always Forever" (Sylk 130 remix) – 9:00

US CD single
 "I Love You Always Forever" (radio edit) – 3:21
 "Simone" (album version) – 4:26

US maxi-CD and Australian CD single
 "I Love You Always Forever" (album version) – 3:58
 "I Love You Always Forever" (Sylk 130 edit) – 4:38
 "I Love You Always Forever" (Sylk 130 remix) – 9:00
 "I Love You Always Forever" (Sylk 130 instrumental) – 4:59
 "I Love You Always Forever" (drumapella) – 5:11

US 12-inch single
A1. "I Love You Always Forever" (Sylk 130 remix) – 9:00
B1. "I Love You Always Forever" (Sylk 130 instrumental) – 4:59
B2. "I Love You Always Forever" (album version) – 3:58
B3. "I Love You Always Forever" (a cappella) – 4:10

US cassette single
 "I Love You Always Forever" (album version) – 3:58
 "Simone" (album version) – 4:26
 "I Love You Always Forever" (Sylk 130 edit) – 4:38

Charts

Weekly charts

Year-end charts

Decade-end charts

All-time charts

Certifications

Release history

Other releases
Lewis has re-recorded the song at least twice. A re-recording with slightly modified instrumentation appears as a bonus track of her 2008 album In the Pink. In 2015, Lewis released the song again on her jazz-influenced covers album, Brand New Day. She initially was reluctant to include the song at all; but the track that appears on the album has a "completely different arrangement", and Lewis says she now likes it. Matt Collar of AllMusic felt that the new version was a "ruminative reworking" of the original.

Betty Who version

Australian pop singer Betty Who released a version of the song on 3 June 2016, with remixes released on 29 July 2016. It was released as the lead single from her second studio album, The Valley.

Music video
The music video, directed by Ben Cope and Daniel Gomes, was released on 14 July 2016.

Chart performance
The song is Who's first to reach the ARIA Charts, peaking at number six while also earning a number one on AirCheck's National Radio Airplay Chart. The song has also had minor success in New Zealand, peaking at number 33. The song was successful on the US Dance Club Songs chart, where it peaked at number one, becoming her third number one on the chart.

Track listings
Digital download
 "I Love You Always Forever" – 3:43

Remixes EP
 "I Love You Always Forever" (Viceroy Remix) – 4:08
 "I Love You Always Forever" (Instant Karma Remix) – 3:39
 "I Love You Always Forever" (Pink Panda Remix) – 4:24
 "I Love You Always Forever" (Mighty Mike & Teesa Remix) – 3:26
 "I Love You Always Forever" (Hector Fonseca & Eduardo Lujan Radio Edit) – 3:33

Weekly charts

Year-end charts

Certifications

Other uses
 The chorus is interpolated in Lennon Stella's song "Save Us", from her debut album Three. Two. One. (2020).
 The song was heavily sampled in Switch Disco's dance song "Everything", which was released on 25 June 2021. The song peaked at No. 8 on the UK iTunes chart.

See also
List of number-one dance singles of 2016 (U.S.)

References

 Feldman, Christopher G. The Billboard Book of Number 2 Singles.

1996 songs
1996 debut singles
2016 singles
Atlantic Records singles
Donna Lewis songs
Betty Who songs
Music based on novels
Music videos directed by Randee St. Nicholas
RCA Records singles
Pop ballads
1990s ballads